Zhan Yuan, also known as Zhongshan Grand Mansion Gate, is a modern Chinese garden designed in a Suzhou and Hangzhou-derived style spanning the Beixi River (北溪河) near Huzhou Mountain (湖洲山) in the south of Zhongshan in Guangdong Province, China. At multiple hectares it is billed as the largest private Chinese garden in the Lingnan area of southern China, and is officially classed as a National AAAA class tourist attraction, the second highest classification.

Conception 
The garden is said to have been inspired by Suzhou and Hangzhou classical Chinese gardens combined with the garden's situation and local Cantonese water townships. It is not fully traditional, for example Australian Callistemon dominate in place of willows, and ornamental imports such as Ravenala madagascariensis are broadly distributed.

Layout 
The garden is split by the Beixi River in to two sections, the southern section and the northern section, joined by a covered bridge. The southern section contains substantial architectural and water features. The northern section contains smaller gardens, pavilions and courtyard architecture. Both sections contain penjing.

History 
The garden was later expanded by constructing the second northern section, gifted to his father. The two sections are linked by a covered bridge.

Gallery

See also

 Chinese architecture
 Ancient Chinese wooden architecture
 List of Chinese gardens
 Penjing

References 

Gardens in Guangdong
Chinese gardens
Zhongshan